Kazimiera Rykowska, née Sobocińska (27 March 1933 – 28 July 2012) was a Polish athlete. She competed in the women's discus throw at the 1960 Summer Olympics.

References

External links
 

1933 births
2012 deaths
Athletes (track and field) at the 1960 Summer Olympics
Polish female discus throwers
Olympic athletes of Poland
People from Sierpc County